Habib Kavuma (born 4 September 1991) is an Ugandan professional footballer who plays for Southern Samity, as a defender.

Career
Born in Makindye, Kavuma has played club football in Uganda and Rwanda for Bunamwaya, APR, Kampala Capital City Authority and SC Villa. In July 2022, it was officially announced that Kavuma signed with CFL Premier Division side Southern Samity in India.

He made his international debut for Uganda in 2009.

References

1991 births
Living people
Ugandan footballers
Uganda international footballers
Vipers SC players
APR F.C. players
Kampala Capital City Authority FC players
SC Villa players
Association football defenders
Ugandan expatriate footballers
Ugandan expatriate sportspeople in Rwanda
Expatriate footballers in Rwanda
Ugandan expatriate sportspeople in India
Expatriate footballers in India
Uganda A' international footballers
2011 African Nations Championship players
Southern Samity players